The Milwaukee Falcons were a minor league professional ice hockey team, based in Milwaukee, Wisconsin, that played in the International Hockey League from 1959 to 1960. Milwaukee placed third in the west division during their only complete season. The Falcons played 17 games into the 1960–61 season, folding on November 26, 1960.

Season-by-season results

External links
 Milwaukee Falcons statistics

International Hockey League (1945–2001) teams
Defunct ice hockey teams in the United States
Ice hockey clubs established in 1959
Sports clubs disestablished in 1960
Ice hockey teams in Wisconsin